Bivens v. Six Unknown Named Agents, 403 U.S. 388 (1971), was a case in which the US Supreme Court ruled that an implied cause of action existed for an individual whose Fourth Amendment protection against unreasonable search and seizures had been violated by the Federal Bureau of Narcotics. The victim of such a deprivation could sue for the violation of the Fourth Amendment itself despite the lack of any federal statute authorizing such a suit. The existence of a remedy for the violation was implied by the importance of the right violated.

The case has been subsequently interpreted to create a cause of action against the federal government similar to the one in 42 U.S.C. § 1983 against the states.

Background

Federal Bureau of Narcotics (FBN) agents searched the Brooklyn home of the plaintiff, Webster Bivens, and arrested him without a warrant. Drug charges were filed but were later dismissed by a US commissioner (now called magistrate judge). Bivens filed a lawsuit alleging the violation of his Fourth Amendment protection from unreasonable search and seizure. The government claimed that the violation allowed for only a state law claim for invasion of privacy and that the Fourth Amendment provides no cause of action but only a rebuttable defense for the FBN agents.

The district court agreed and dismissed the suit for lack of subject-matter jurisdiction and for Bivens's failure to state a claim upon which relief can be granted. The Second Circuit Court of Appeals affirmed. The Supreme Court granted certiorari on that secondary issue of whether a plaintiff can bring a claim in federal court based solely on an alleged violation of his Fourth Amendment rights.

Bivens was represented pro bono by Stephen A. Grant.

Decision
The Supreme Court, in an opinion by Justice Brennan, laid down a rule that it will infer a private right of action for monetary damages where no other federal remedy is provided for the vindication of a constitutional right, based on the principle that "for every wrong, there is a remedy". The court reasoned based upon a presumption that where there is a violation of a right, the plaintiff can recover whatever he could recover under any civil action, unless Congress has expressly curtailed that right of recovery, or there exist some "special factors counseling hesitation".

Concurrence
Justice Harlan voted with the majority to reverse the lower court but also wrote a separate concurring opinion.

 

Harlan particularly emphasized the special importance of constitutional rights. He presented that it was well-settled, even undeniable, that a suit for injunction based on a constitutional right had been long recognized in the Federal courts. However, a suit for damages should be as or more acceptable.

Dissents
Dissenting opinions were written by Chief Justice Burger and by Justices Black and Blackmun.

Chief Justice Burger's dissent asserted that the decision was legislating an area that should be left to Congress. Justice Black basically agreed with Justice Burger and was worried about the growing docket. Justice Blackmun went a step further, saying the decision "opens the door for another avalanche of new federal cases".

Subsequent case law
In Davis v. Passman, the Supreme Court upheld a Fifth Circuit opinion that held that even though there existed "an explicit congressional prohibition against judicial remedies for those in petitioner's position", the Court declined to infer that Congress also sought to foreclose an alternative remedy directly under the Fifth Amendment.

 Stafford v. Briggs, 

In Carlson v. Green, the court held that a damages remedy would be available despite the absence of any statute conferring such a right, unless: (1) Congress had provided an alternative remedy which it "explicitly declared to be a substitute for recovery directly under the Constitution"; or (2) the defendant could demonstrate any "special factors counseling hesitation".

 Chappell v. Wallace, 

In Bush v. Lucas, the Court refrained from implying a Bivens remedy due to the availability of alternative remedies for the first time.

 Mitchell v. Forsyth, 
 Anderson v. Creighton, 
 United States v. Stanley, 
 Schweiker v. Chilicky, 
 McCarthy v. Madigan, 

In FDIC v. Meyer, and Correctional Services Corporation v. Malesko, the court held that the fundamental logic supporting Bivens was to deter constitutional violations by individual officers, not federal agencies.

 Farmer v. Brennan, 
 Saucier v. Katz, 
 Hartman v. Moore, 

In Wilkie v. Robbins, the court held that the difficulty inherent in "defining limits to legitimate zeal on the public's behalf in situations where hard bargaining is to be expected" was a "special factor" that counseled against the availability of a Bivens remedy.

 Ashcroft v. Iqbal, 
 Hui v. Castaneda, 
 Ashcroft v. al-Kidd, 

In Minneci v. Pollard, the court denied a Bivens action for Eighth Amendment violations committed by employees of a private prison because "state tort law authorizes adequate alternative damages actions … that provide both significant deterrence and compensation", despite acknowledging that these officials were "act[ing] under color of federal law".

 Reichle v. Howards, 
 Wood v. Moss, 
 Ziglar v. Abbasi, 
 Hernandez v. Mesa, 
 Hernandez v. Mesa, 
 Brownback v. King, 
 Egbert v. Boule,

Subsequent developments

Scholarship on Bivens success rate
According to Alexander A. Reinert, law professor at the Benjamin N. Cardozo School of Law of Yeshiva University, many attorneys assumed Bivens claims were far less successful than other civil rights litigation. However, Reinert's research showed outcomes for plaintiffs more promising than had been assumed: "Depending on the procedural posture, presence of counsel, and type of case," success ranged from "16% to more than 40%," and that "when Bivens claims fail, it very rarely is because of the qualified immunity defense."

Egbert v. Boule
The Supreme Court granted Egbert v. Boule, 596 U.S. ___ (2022), in November 2021, which is expected to review extensions of Bivens related remedies. The case involves a lawsuit filed by Robert Boule, the owner of an inn at the U.S.-Canada border against U.S. Border Patrol agent Erik Egbert related to a 2014 incident. In the incident, after Boule asked Egbert to leave his property when Egbert had approached a Turkish man about his immigration status, Egbert pushed Boule to the ground. Boule complained to the Border Patrol, which in turn led Egbert to prompt the IRS to investigate Boule. Boule claimed his First and Fourth Amendment rights were violated under Bivens. The district court found against Boule asserting his claims were an inappropriate extension of Bivens, but the Ninth Circuit reversed. 

In a 6-3 decision, the Supreme Court of the United States decided that the authority of the court to find a course of action under Bivens does not extend to Robert Boule claim of excessive force under the Fourth Amendment to the United States Constitution and his First Amendment retaliation claim.

See also
 Qualified immunity
 List of United States Supreme Court cases, volume 403

References

Sources

External links
  
 Casebrief Bivens v. Six Unknown Named Agents of Federal Bureau of Narcotics a provided by Bloomberg Law's Law Cases & Case Briefs for Students

United States Supreme Court cases
Implied constitutional cause of action case law
United States Fourth Amendment case law
Drug Enforcement Administration litigation
1971 in United States case law
United States Supreme Court cases of the Burger Court
1970s in Brooklyn